is a puzzle video game developed by Eighting and published by Nintendo for the Game Boy Advance handheld video game console. It was released in Japan on March 21, 2001, and in Europe and Australia on June 22 as a launch title. North America saw the title for the first time on February 11, 2016, via the Wii U's Virtual Console service. Kuru Kuru Kururin is the first title in the Kururin series and was followed by two Japan-only sequels, Kururin Paradise and Kururin Squash!. On February 8, 2023, it was released on the Nintendo Switch Online + Expansion Pack.

Gameplay

The player controls a slowly spinning stick called the Helirin, or the Helicopter in the European localization, and must maneuver it through a series of mazes without touching the walls. The player controls the direction and speed of movement (there are 3 levels of speed), but the task is made difficult as the stick rotates continuously. The Helirin can move faster by holding down any of the two face buttons, and even faster by holding down both. There are bonuses to collect, record times to beat, and a gold star for completing the level without any accidents. The game also features multiplayer support, which enables four players to participate in the action using a single cartridge.

The game starts with simple training levels, in which players are told how to play and how to get around the first corners. After that, there are three levels in each stage, which get progressively harder and longer. The obstacles and the look of the levels (ice, cave, machine, etc.) vary between stages. Beginners can play the levels on Easy mode, where the stick is only half of its usual size.

There is a mode called Challenge mode, which is a collection of smaller levels, usually involving only one or two corners or objects to dodge.

Plot
The story begins when Kururin's brothers and sisters go missing, and it is up to him to find them. Kururin is initially unsure that he is up to the task because he has never left his home world before. Being the adventurous and helpful fellow he is, Kururin agrees to rescue his lost family. Teacher Hare trains Kururin in the art of controlling the Helirin, a stick-shaped helicopter that has a slow-spinning propeller. Piloting the Helirin through the different worlds will be a difficult task, but using Teacher Hare's valuable lessons, Kururin bravely sets out on his adventure to rescue his lost family.

Development
Kuru Kuru Kururin was developed by the Japanese company Eighting and first announced at the Nintendo Space World 2000.

Reception

Kuru Kuru Kururin received mostly positive reviews from critics. It was praised for its simple yet addictive gameplay. Eurogamer rated the game a score of 9 out of 10 points. The reviewer lauded the game's learning curve and stated that there would be no other puzzle game on the Game Boy Advance at the time that can "rival Kuru Kuru Kururin for its sheer addictiveness and fun-value". Nintendo World Report, then known as Planet GameCube, gave Kuru Kuru Kururin the same score as Eurogamer and declared that it is "simple enough that anyone can pick this game up and play". The reviewer praised the game's multiplayer mode, which he described as "an absolute blast", as well as its lasting appeal, but also commented that the "cutesy" characters and music would be a turn-off for "a lot of people". Jeff Gerstmann of GameSpot rated Kuru Kuru Kururin 7.1 out of 10 and described its graphics as "simple but effective". He stated that the game is "excellent at filling up small periods of free time with its short, level-based nature". Computer and Video Games was less impressed by the game, rating it 5 out of 10. The reviewer declared the game to be "extremely frustrating" and said that it lacks "the perfect simplicity" of other puzzle games such as Mr. Driller and Tetris. Nonetheless, he also commented that the novel gameplay of Kuru Kuru Kururin "will find many fans" and that the multiplayer mode is "unexpectedly brilliant".

Legacy
The first sequel entitled Kururin Paradise came out in 2002 for the Game Boy Advance. It was released in Japan only, even though Kururin Paradise was previously showcased at E3 2002, the first time a Kururin game had been announced for the American market. Another sequel was also released only in Japan for the GameCube in 2004, entitled Kururin Squash!, which became the only title of the series to use 3D computer graphics, as well as to appear on a home console.

Several references to the Kururin series are made in the Super Smash Bros. series. The Helirin makes a cameo appearance as a trophy in Super Smash Bros. Melee, but is incorrectly referred to as "Heririn" in the American version. The Helirin later appears in Super Smash Bros. Brawl as an Assist Trophy. Unlike most Assist Trophies, it doesn't attack, but it becomes part of the stage, and can be used as a platform or a wall. Several other things in the Kururin series appear as Trophies and Stickers in the game.

Notes

References

External links
Kuru Kuru Kururin at Nintendo.com.au (archived from the original)
Official Japanese website (translated using Excite.co.jp)
Official Japanese SpaceWorld 2000 webpage (translated using Excite.co.jp)

2001 video games
Eighting games
Game Boy Advance games
Game Boy Advance-only games
Helicopter video games
Nintendo games
Nintendo Switch Online games
Puzzle video games
Video games developed in Japan
Video games scored by Atsuhiro Motoyama
Virtual Console games
Virtual Console games for Wii U
Multiplayer and single-player video games